The 8th Trampoline World Championships were held in Johannesburg, South Africa on 23 March 1974.

Results

Men

Trampoline

Trampoline Synchro

Women

Trampoline

Trampoline Synchro

References
 Trampoline UK

Trampoline World Championships
Trampoline Gymnastics World Championships
1974 in South African sport
International gymnastics competitions hosted by South Africa